Roy Burton (born 13 March 1951 in Wantage, Berkshire) is an English former footballer, come property tycoon.

He played as a, goalkeeper, playing 449 games, in a thirteen and a half year spell for Oxford United, before moving on to Witney Town.

External links
Roy Burton in club history

References
 

1951 births
Living people
People from Wantage
English footballers
Association football goalkeepers
Oxford United F.C. players
English Football League players
Witney Town F.C. players